Rickards is an English surname. It is closely related to the surnames Rickard and Richards.

Rickards may refer to:
Ashley Rickards, American actor
Barrie Rickards, British paleontologist
Clint Rickards, New Zealand police officer
Edwin Alfred Rickards, British architect
Emily Bett Rickards, Canadian actress
Esther Rickards (1893–1977), British surgeon and politician
Sir George Kettilby Rickards
George William Rickards, Member of Parliament
Harry Rickards, British-born comedian
James Rickards, American lawyer and financial commentator
Jocelyn Rickards (1924–2005), Australian costume designer 
John Rickards (author), British crime-writer
John Rickards (priest), South African Anglican priest
John E. Rickards, American politician
Ken Rickards, West-Indian cricketer
Samuel Rickards, British clergyman
Scott Rickards, British footballer
Tudor Rickards, Welsh academic and author on business

English-language surnames